Kezie Apps (born 4 February 1991) is an Australian rugby league footballer who plays as a  for the St George Illawarra Dragons in the NRL Women's Premiership and the Wests Tigers in the NSWRL Women's Premiership.

She is an Australian international and New South Wales representative.

Background
Born in Bega, New South Wales, Apps played her junior rugby league for the Bega Roosters alongside current Cronulla Sutherland Sharks player Dale Finucane. 

At age 12, she was forced to stop playing due to age restrictions that were in place. Her older brother Deon, played two games for the South Sydney Rabbitohs in 2011.

Playing career
In 2014, Apps returned to rugby league, joining the Helensburgh Tigers women's side. Later that year, she made her debut for New South Wales in the annual Women's Interstate Challenge against Queensland and Australia in their Four Nations curtain-raiser against New Zealand. At the end of the season, she was named the Illawarra Women's Player of the Year and the NSWRL Women's Player of the Year.

In 2015, she made her debut for the Women's All Star side in their annual fixture against the Indigenous All Stars.

On 28 September 2016, she won the women's Dally M Medal for Player of the Year at the Dally M awards.

In October 2017, she was named in Australia's 2017 Women's Rugby League World Cup squad. On 2 December, she started at second row in the Jillaroos 23-16 final win over the New Zealand.

In June 2018, Apps, along with Sam Bremner and Talesha Quinn, were named as the three marquee players for the St. George Illawarra Dragons women's team which will commence playing in the NRL Women's Premiership starting in September.

On 6 October 2019, she captained the Dragons in their 6–30 Grand Final loss to the Brisbane Broncos.

Achievements and accolades

Individual
Dally M Medal: 2016
NSWRL State Player of the Year: 2014, 2016

Captained NSW to State of Origin win in 2022

St George Illawarra Dragons NRLW Captain 2021 - present

Team
2017 Women's Rugby League World Cup: Australia – Winners

References

External links
St George Illawarra Dragons profile

1991 births
Living people
Australian female rugby league players
Rugby league players from Bega, New South Wales
Australia women's national rugby league team players
Rugby league second-rows
St. George Illawarra Dragons (NRLW) players
Wests Tigers NSWRL Women's Premiership players